Rhinichthys, known as the riffle daces, is a genus of freshwater fish in the carp family (Cyprinidae) of the order Cypriniformes.  The type species is Rhinichthys atratulus, the blacknose dace. Rhinichthys species range throughout North America.

The genus contains eight living species, one of which (the loach minnow) is considered Vulnerable.  It also includes the extinct Las Vegas dace, which was only first described in 1984 and had disappeared by 1986.  The cheat minnow (Pararhinichthys bowersi), a natural hybrid of the longnose dace (R. cataractae) and the river chub (Nocomis micropogon), was formerly placed in this genus, but is now valid under Pararhinichthys.

The riffle daces are a basal lineage in an insufficiently resolved clade of American Leuciscinae. Such a group had been proposed on anatomical evidence, and was verified using mtDNA 12S rRNA sequences.(Simons & Mayden 1997)

Species
 Rhinichthys atratulus (Hermann, 1804) (Eastern blacknose dace)
 Rhinichthys cataractae (Valenciennes, 1842) (Longnose dace)
 Rhinichthys cobitis (Girard, 1856) (Loach minnow)
 †Rhinichthys deaconi R. R. Miller, 1984 (Las Vegas dace)
 Rhinichthys evermanni Snyder, 1908 (Umpqua dace)
 Rhinichthys falcatus (C. H. Eigenmann & R. S. Eigenmann, 1893) (Leopard dace)
 Rhinichthys obtusus Agassiz, 1854 (Western blacknose dace)
 Rhinichthys osculus (Girard, 1856) (Speckled dace)
 Rhinichthys umatilla (C. H. Gilbert & Evermann, 1894) (Umatilla dace)

References
  (1997): Phylogenetic Relationships of the Creek Chubs and the Spine-Fins: an Enigmatic Group of North American Cyprinid Fishes (Actinopterygii: Cyprinidae). Cladistics 13(3): 187-205.  (HTML abstract)

 
Cyprinidae genera
Cyprinid fish of North America